Nina Ulyanovna Alisova (15 December 1915 in Kyiv – 12 October 1996 in Moscow) was a Soviet theater and film actress. Honored Artist of the RSFSR (1950). After her death she was buried in the Troyekurovskoye Cemetery.

Selected filmography
 Without a Dowry (1937)
 Rainbow (1944)
 Ivan Pavlov (1949)
 The Lady with the Dog (1960)
 Torrents of Steel (1967)
 Shirli-myrli (1995)

External links

1915 births
1996 deaths
Soviet actresses
Communist Party of the Soviet Union members
Gerasimov Institute of Cinematography alumni
Honored Artists of the RSFSR
Stalin Prize winners
Recipients of the Order of the Red Banner of Labour

Burials in Troyekurovskoye Cemetery